Cyperus tatandaensis is a species of sedge that is native to parts of Africa, South America and Central America.

See also 
 List of Cyperus species

References 

tenuis
Plants described in 1788
Flora of Belize
Flora of Benin
Flora of Bolivia
Flora of Brazil
Flora of Cameroon
Flora of Burkina Faso
Flora of the Central African Republic
Flora of Chad
Flora of Colombia
Flora of Costa Rica
Flora of Cuba
Flora of the Dominican Republic
Flora of El Salvador
Flora of Equatorial Guinea
Flora of Gabon
Flora of Ghana
Flora of Guatemala
Flora of Guinea
Flora of Honduras
Flora of Ivory Coast
Flora of Jamaica
Flora of Liberia
Flora of Mexico
Flora of Nigeria
Flora of Panama
Flora of Paraguay
Flora of Senegal
Flora of Venezuela
Taxa named by Olof Swartz
Flora without expected TNC conservation status